Wylie Dufresne (born 1970) is the chef and owner of Du's Donuts and the former chef and owner of the wd~50 and Alder restaurants in Manhattan. Dufresne is a leading American proponent of molecular gastronomy, the movement to incorporate science and new techniques in the preparation and presentation of food.

Early life
Born in 1970 in Providence, Rhode Island, Dufresne is a graduate of Friends Seminary and The French Culinary Institute (now known as The International Culinary Center) in New York. In 1992, he completed a B.A. in philosophy at Colby College in Waterville, Maine.

Career
From 1994 through 1999, he worked for Jean-Georges Vongerichten, where he was eventually named sous chef at Vongerichten's eponymous Jean Georges. In 1998 he was chef de cuisine at Vongerichten's Prime in The Bellagio, Las Vegas. In 1999, he left to become the first chef at 71 Clinton Fresh Food. In April 2003, he opened his 70-seat restaurant, wd~50 (named for the chef's initials and the street address, as well as a pun on WD-40) on Clinton Street on Manhattan's Lower East Side. In March 2013, he opened a second restaurant Alder in the East Village. wd-50 closed 30 November 2014 and Alder closed in August 2015.

Dufresne was a James Beard Foundation nominee for Rising Star Chef of the Year in 2000 and chosen the same year by New York Magazine for their New York Awards. Food & Wine magazine named him one of 2001 America's Ten Best Chefs award and, in 2006, New York Magazine's Adam Platt placed wd-50 fourth in his list of New York's 101 best restaurants. He was awarded a star in Michelin's New York City Guide, 2006, 2007, and 2008, the first Red Guide for North America, and was nominated for Best Chef New York by the James Beard Foundation. His signature preparations include Pickled Beef Tongue with Fried Mayonnaise and Carrot-Coconut Sunnyside-Up. 

In 2006, Dufresne lost to Mario Batali on Iron Chef America. In 2007, he began making appearances as a judge on Bravo's Top Chef, which includes season 2, season 4, season 5, season 7 and season 12. He was invited to participate in Top Chef Masters in 2009, where he placed third out of four in the preliminary rounds. Dufresne also appeared in the final of the United Kingdom version of Masterchef, teaching the eventual winner. He appeared as himself in the 5th Episode of HBO's Treme alongside Tom Colicchio, Eric Ripert and David Chang.  He is mentioned in the opening episode of HBO's Silicon Valley (TV series) for creating Liquid Shrimp. When asked how it tastes, Guilfoyle responds, "Like how I would imagine cum tastes"

In 2013, Dufresne won the James Beard Foundation's Best NYC Chef. It was his 10th nomination and first win. Dufresne’s  wd50 restaurant in New York City closed in 2014.

In April 2017, Dufresne, along with head baker Colin Kull and general manager Sharilyn Chavez, took over a pop-up space at the William Vale Hotel in Williamsburg as Du's Donuts & Coffee. The pop-up grew into a small chain that now has locations in Soho and Brooklyn. Dufresne's cookbook wd~50, co-written with Peter Meehan, was published in October 2017.

References

External links 
 Du's Donuts
 Podcast interview with Wylie Dufresne, April 2008.
 Big Think video interview,  August 2010.

1970 births
Living people
American television chefs
American male chefs
Colby College alumni
International Culinary Center alumni
Molecular gastronomy
Head chefs of Michelin starred restaurants
Date of birth missing (living people)
Businesspeople from Providence, Rhode Island
Businesspeople from New York City
James Beard Foundation Award winners
Friends Seminary alumni
Chefs from Rhode Island
American gastronomes